Cenei is a commune in Timiș County, Romania. It is composed of two villages, Bobda and Cenei (commune seat). It also included Checea until 2004, when it was split off to form a separate commune.

History 
Cenei is one of the oldest settlements in Banat, first recorded in 1221 as a property of the archdiocese of Ittebe, today in Serbian Banat. By 1330 it belonged to the Sărad Fortress. Cenei was the site of a battle between the Turkish and Austrian troops on 20 August 1696.

As of 1720, the natives were mostly Romanians and Serbs. Through the efforts of the Vuketići family, Cenei was colonized with Croats between 1801 and 1820. German settlers arrived here only after 1848, much later than other nearby settlements. The Hungarian population did not settle here in waves of colonists, but gradually, over a long period of time. Today's village was formed by merging Ceneiu Sârbesc ("Serbian Cenei") and Ceneiu Croat ("Croatian Cenei") in 1902.

Demographics 

Cenei had a population of 2,670 inhabitants at the 2011 census, down 7% from the 2002 census. Most inhabitants are Romanians (67.23%), larger minorities being represented by Serbs (16.1%), Hungarians (8.8%) and Germans (1.46%). For 5.36% of the population, ethnicity is unknown. By religion, most inhabitants are Orthodox (62.17%), but there are also minorities of Serbian Orthodox (15.43%), Roman Catholics (11.09%) and Pentecostals (3.41%). For 5.36% of the population, religious affiliation is unknown.

Notes

References 

Communes in Timiș County
Localities in Romanian Banat